Diakopi is a village in the Vardousia mountains, in Phocis, Greece. Until 1927 it was officially known as Granitsa (Γρανίτσα), a name that remains in common usage.

References

External links 
 www.diakopi.gr

Populated places in Phocis